Renan Carvalho Mota (born 1 October 1991), is a Brazilian footballer who plays as an attacking midfielder for Vila Nova.

Club career
Born in Marabá, Pará, Renan Mota graduated from Santos' youth setup. On 8 February 2011 he was loaned to União São João, making his senior debuts for the side.

After a short loan stint at Sport Barueri, Renan Mota made his Série A debut for Peixe on 29 June 2011, coming on as a late substitute for Rychely in a 1–2 away loss against Figueirense. He was subsequently loaned to Democrata-GV, Ituano and Araxá, failing to settle with any of them.

In August 2013 Renan Mota joined Monte Azul permanently. On 29 April of the following year he moved to Guarani, in a temporary deal until December.

On 24 November 2014 Renan Mota signed for São Bento, newly promoted to Campeonato Paulista.

References

External links

1991 births
Living people
People from Marabá
Brazilian footballers
Association football forwards
Campeonato Brasileiro Série A players
Santos FC players
União São João Esporte Clube players
Esporte Clube Democrata players
Ituano FC players
Atlético Monte Azul players
Guarani FC players
Esporte Clube São Bento players
Oeste Futebol Clube players
J2 League players
Kyoto Sanga FC players
Associação Atlética Ponte Preta players
Brazilian expatriate footballers
Brazilian expatriate sportspeople in Japan
Expatriate footballers in Japan
Sportspeople from Pará